Shea Tierney (born October 19, 1986) is an American football coach who is the quarterbacks coach for the New York Giants of the National Football League. Shea was hired by the Buffalo Bills in 2018 as an offensive assistant and was promoted to assistant QBs coach in 2020. Previously, Tierney spent three seasons with the Philadelphia Eagles as an analyst and coaching intern. He also worked for Alabama as an offensive analyst.

Coaching career

N.C. State
Beginning in 2011, Tierney spent three seasons with the NC State Wolfpack as an offensive graduate assistant.

Philadelphia Eagles
In 2013, Tierney was hired by the Philadelphia Eagles as an analyst and coaching intern. He spent 3 seasons with the team.

Alabama
In 2016, Tierney acted as an offensive analyst under Coach Nick Saban and current New York Giants head coach Brian Daboll. Tierney assisted in leading the 2016 team to a 14–1 season, ending in an SEC Championship. He worked closely with Mike Locksley, former wide-receivers coach and current head coach at Maryland.

Buffalo Bills
In 2018, Tierney was hired by the Buffalo Bills as an offensive analyst, and was promoted to Assistant Quarterbacks Coach for the 2020 season. During his tenure with the Bills, Tierney helped to guide quarterback Josh Allen to finish second in the 2020 MVP voting and set single season franchise records for passing touchdowns (37), completions (396), 300 yard games (8), passer rating (107.2), completion percentage (69.2), passing yards (4,544) and total touchdowns (46). During the 2021 season, Allen had a career-high 409 pass completions, completing 63.3 percent of his passes for 4,407 passing yards, 36 passing touchdowns and a 92.2 passer rating. He also had 763 rushing yards and another six touchdowns on the ground, leading the league in yards per carry at 6.3

New York Giants
On February 2, 2022, Tierney was hired by the New York Giants as their Quarterbacks Coach. He follows Daboll, who was named head coach of the Giants on January 28, 2022.

Personal life
In July 2021, Shea married Emily Seng in Raleigh, North Carolina.

References

Living people
1986 births
NC State Wolfpack football coaches
Alabama Crimson Tide football coaches
Philadelphia Eagles coaches
Buffalo Bills coaches
New York Giants coaches
Sportspeople from Philadelphia